Sirivadhanabhakdi is a Thai surname. Notable people with the surname include:

 Charoen Sirivadhanabhakdi (born 1944), Thai billionaire businessman
 Thapana Sirivadhanabhakdi (born 1974/75), Thai businessman, CEO of ThaiBev

Thai-language surnames
Sirivadhanabhakdi family